John Arthur Frederick Settle (born 1895) was an English professional footballer who played as a left back. He made appearances in the English Football League for Wrexham.

References

1895 births
Date of death unknown
English footballers
Association football defenders
English Football League players
Chester City F.C. players
Wrexham A.F.C. players
Bangor City F.C. players
Holywell Town F.C. players
Caernarvon Athletic F.C. players
Rhyl F.C. players